Radical 210 meaning "even" or "uniformly" is 1 of 2 Kangxi radicals (214 radicals total) composed of 14 strokes.

In the Kangxi Dictionary there are 18 characters (out of 49,030) to be found under this radical.

Characters with Radical 210

Literature

External links
Unihan Database - U+9F4A

210